Yana Orjo (possibly from Quechua yana black, urqu mountain, "black mountain") is a mountain in the Vilcanota mountain range in the Andes of Peru, about  high. It is located in the Cusco Region, Canchis Province, Pitumarca District. Yana Orjo lies west of the lake Sibinacocha. It is situated south of the mountains Cóndor Tuco and Chuallani, northeast of Orco Puñuna and east of Othaña.

References

Mountains of Peru
Mountains of Cusco Region